Kushtrim Munishi (born 17 March 1973) is a Kosovan Albanian professional football coach and former player who is the current manager of women's Kosovo U19 and U17 team.

Playing career

Club
Kushtrim Munishi started his career in 1990 making his first appearance for FC Prishtina at the age of 17. He made 5 appearances and scored one goal in 1990–91 Yugoslav Second League and one appearance in 1991–92 Yugoslav Second League.

In 1993, he joined Zagłębie Lubin from Poland. From 1993 to 1999, he played for DSV Leoben (and for a brief time in autumn 1997 for ASKOe Gurnitz in Carinthia, both in Austria), Lokomotiv Plovdiv in Bulgaria and Partizani in Albania.

After the end of the war in Kosovo he returned playing initially for FC Prishtina and then for Besiana, KF Kosova (P), Flamurtari, Gjilani and Hysi. In his last season he played for FC Prishtina, and was a crucial player in winning the Champion of Kosovo title.

While playing overseas he was put in the position of midfielder, which was not his natural role; in Kosovo he was a striker.

After 2000, while playing in Kosovo, he was awarded as Best Soccer Player in Kosovo and Best Sportsman and won Best Goal Scoring Award three times.

He retired in 2008 and currently he is the head coach of Kosovo's female national squad in the U-19 and U-16 category.

International
On 1 February 1993, Munishi received a call-up from Kosovo for a friendly match against Albania, and made his debut after being named in the starting line-up and scored his side's only goal during a 3–1 away defeat.

Coaching career
After retiring from football he attended UEFA Coaching License training and obtained a UEFA Pro License. Since 2000 he worked as a coach for U17 and U19 of FC Prishtina and was Direct of Football Academy. In 2016, he became Head Coach of the FC Prishtina Senior team and immediately won the Kosovo Super Cup. In the Superliga of Kosovo he managed his team to six victories and one draw, leading the Kosovo Superliga ranking. Following a disagreement on a professional basis and since he didn't want to work without a professional contract, he left the club.

Since February 2017 he has been Coach for U19 and U16 females at Federation Football of Kosovo. With the U16 generation he won an international tournament in Tallinn, Estonia which became the first ever UEFA tournament won by Kosovo.

References

External sources
 
 

1973 births
Living people
Sportspeople from Pristina
Association football midfielders
Kosovan footballers
Kosovo pre-2014 international footballers
FC Prishtina players
Zagłębie Lubin players
DSV Leoben players
PFC Lokomotiv Plovdiv players
FK Partizani Tirana players
FK Besiana players
KF Flamurtari players
KF KEK players
SC Gjilani players
KF Hysi players
Football Superleague of Kosovo players
Ekstraklasa players
First Professional Football League (Bulgaria) players
Kategoria Superiore players
Expatriate footballers in Poland
Kosovan expatriate sportspeople in Poland
Expatriate footballers in Austria
Kosovan expatriate sportspeople in Austria
Expatriate footballers in Bulgaria
Kosovan expatriate sportspeople in Bulgaria
Expatriate footballers in Albania
Kosovan expatriate sportspeople in Albania
Kosovan football managers
FC Prishtina managers